Sulthankada is a village in the Idukki district of Kerala, India.  It is located between Pampupara and Anakkara on Kumily - Munnar highway.  This village includes tiny settlements - Chittampara, Keerimukku, Churuli Valavu, Puthumana Medu, Thenganal Kavala, Thaloda, etc.  mostly covering cardamom and pepper plantations, pepper grows and paddy fields.

The nearest Airports are Kochi 175 km and Madurai 165 km. Closest railway stations are Kottayam 124 km, Changanassery 130 km, Kochi 175 km and Madurai 165 km. The nearest private and KSRTC Bus stations are Kattappana 20 km and Kumily 13 km

The population includes people migrated from Kottayam and Ernakulam districts of Kerala and Theni and Madurai districts of Tamil Nadu.  
Main source of income is agricultural produces (Pepper, Cardamom, Ginger, paddy, coffee beans, tea leaves, etc.).  There are many cardamom dry units available here.

References

Villages in Idukki district